Cleonia is a genus of plants in the mint family (Lamiaceae), first described in 1763. It contains only one known species, Cleonia lusitanica, native to Spain, Portugal, Algeria, Morocco, and Tunisia.

References

External links
Linnean Collection photo of type specimen
Wildflowers of Andalucia
Project Noah

Lamiaceae
Flora of North Africa
Flora of Spain
Flora of Portugal
Flora of the Mediterranean Basin
Monotypic Lamiaceae genera
Taxa named by Carl Linnaeus